Farmington is a historic plantation house located near St. Stephens Church, King and Queen County, Virginia. The original structure was built about 1795, and later enlarged and modified to its present form in 1859–1860.  It is a large two-story frame house, with a low-pitch hip roof and deep eaves. It has a two-story rear addition on the building's southwest side and a one-story addition on the southeast side.  Also on the property are a contributing large braced-frame barn, a weaving house, and an overseer's house.

It was listed on the National Register of Historic Places in 1995.

References

Plantation houses in Virginia
Houses on the National Register of Historic Places in Virginia
Houses completed in 1795
Houses in King and Queen County, Virginia
National Register of Historic Places in King and Queen County, Virginia